Afure Adah (born 9 September 1997) is a Papua New Guinean sprinter. She competed in the women's 100 metres and 200 metres at the 2018 Commonwealth Games.

Personal bests
Outdoor

Indoor

All information taken from IAAF profile.

References

External links

1997 births
Living people
Papua New Guinean female sprinters
Place of birth missing (living people)
Athletes (track and field) at the 2018 Commonwealth Games
Commonwealth Games competitors for Papua New Guinea